Capilano—Howe Sound was a federal electoral district in British Columbia, Canada,  that was represented in the House of Commons of Canada from 1988 to 1997.

This riding was created in 1987 from parts of Capilano and Cariboo—Chilcotin ridings.

It was abolished in 1996 when it was merged into West Vancouver—Sunshine Coast riding.

It consisted of the northwest part of the North Vancouver District Municipality, the District Municipality of West Vancouver, the part of electoral Area B of the Greater Vancouver Regional District west of the Capilano River and north of Electoral Area A, the Village of Lions Bay, Electoral Area C of the Greater Vancouver Regional District, and the Squamish-Lillooet Regional District, except Electoral Areas A and B and the Village of Lillooet.

Members of Parliament

Electoral history

See also 

 List of Canadian federal electoral districts
 Past Canadian electoral districts

External links 
Riding history from the Library of Parliament

Former federal electoral districts of British Columbia